King's College is a private co-educational secondary boarding and day school in Taunton, Somerset, England. A member school of the Woodard Corporation, it has approximately 450 pupils aged 13 to 18, including about 300 boarders. Its affiliated prep school is King's Hall School. The head of the school is currently Michael Sloan, who started his first academic year in the winter of 2022.

History
King's College, Taunton, or King Alfred's College as it was originally named, was founded in 1880 by Canon Nathaniel Woodard. King's College was the fifth of the Woodard schools to be opened. Woodard purchased the recently built buildings of Taunton Grammar School in South Road when financial difficulties forced the Grammar School to move back to their original site. The buildings had been designed by Charles Edmund Giles under the instructions of the Grammar School's Headmaster William Tuckwell and were built between 1867 and 1869. Maintaining the link with the past, Woodard adopted the pelican badge of Bishop Richard Fox (the Grammar School's founder) as the new King’s crest. Today Bishop Fox and Tuckwell are still names of school Houses and former pupils are known as Old Aluredians (OAs) after King Alfred.

One of the most notable parts of the school is the Chapel, built from 1903 and designed by W. E. Tower with later extensions in 1936 and 1986. The Chapel was the particular project of the school Provost, Prebendary Henry Meynell, who sought the support of benefactors, most notably the former Prime Minister the Marquess of Salisbury. Henry Richards MP bestowed the fine organ formerly in St Michael Bassishaw. The school also had the support of the Gibbs Family of Tyntesfield. H. Martin Gibbs, the school Custos, was responsible for building the Lady Chapel and for donating some fine pieces of devotional art. The main building has been designated as a Grade II listed building.

Benjamin Disraeli stood for MP in Taunton, and many of his early political appearances took place on what is currently the school's 1st XV Rugby pitch. After the Italian invasion of Ethiopia in 1936, Emperor Haile Selassie I fled in exile to Bath. During his stay in the UK his youngest son and eldest grandson went to King's College, and the Emperor himself distributed awards at Sports Day in 1937. Two trophies were donated by the Emperor.  Before the General Election in 1964, the prime minister, Sir Alec Douglas-Home, addressed a public meeting at the school.

Junior pupils (from the age of around 8) were part of the school from 1880. When the school purchased Pyrland Hall in 1952 the Junior School moved to that site. Pyrland Hall is now known as King's Hall School co-educational prep school.

The school became co-educational in 1968 (in that it admitted girls into the Sixth Form), becoming fully co-educational in 1991. There are currently seven boarding houses: Bishop Fox, King Alfred, Woodard (After Nathaniel Woodard) Tuckwell (after William Tuckwell, Meynell, Taylor and Carpenter. All these houses, plus Neates, King Edward's and Perratt's, which no longer exist, were male boarding houses until 1991 when Meynell converted to become the first all female boarding house. Carpenter became a female boarding house in 1994 and Taylor house was founded as a female boarding house in 1997.  Until the conversion to full coeducational status, Sixth Form girls were assigned to one of the male boarding houses but lived in separate accommodation.

In 2007, the school choir took part in a choral competition on the BBC programme Songs of Praise and came first, and in the same year the senior rugby team were victorious in The National Schools 7's. The school chapel is the venue for an annual concert by the Somerset chamber choir.

Houses
Boys
  King Alfred
  Tuckwell
  Woodard
  Bishop Fox
  Neates (Disbanded)
Girls
  Carpenter
  Taylor
  Meynell

Notable students

Former students of King's College, Taunton, are referred to as "Old Aluredians".

 Robin Appleford, youngest pilot in the Battle of Britain - 1940
 Neil Brand, South African cricketer.
 Jos Buttler, cricketer; Wicketkeeper and white ball captain for England plays first class cricket for Lancashire. Was part of the England  team that won the 2019 ICC World Cup and captained the team that won the 2022 ICC T20 World Cup.
 Charles Ching, judge
 Tom Banton, Somerset and England cricketer
 Sir Geoffrey Cox QC PC MP, Her Majesty's Attorney General of England and Wales and Advocate General of Northern Ireland, 2018–20, Conservative Member of Parliament
 Richard Harden, first-class cricketer for Somerset
 Calvin Harrison, cricketer
 Antony Hewish, Nobel Prize in Physics - 1974
 Sir John Keegan, military historian
 Neil Kernon, musician, record producer
 Simon Jones, film, stage TV & radio actor, narrator
 Henry Litton CBE, judge
 Christopher Mackenzie-Beevor, courtier
 Jonathan Meades, author and broadcaster
 Angus Moon, QC and Head of Chambers at Serjeants Inn
 David Pipe, racehorse trainer
 Geoffrey Rippon, Baron Rippon of Hexham PC, Conservative Member of Parliament
 Matthew Robinson, rugby player for Wales
 Michael Scott (priest), pioneer campaigner against apartheid
 Juno Temple, actress
 Roger Twose, first-class cricketer for New Zealand
 Ted Nash, English entrepreneur
 Tom Voyce, rugby player for Gloucester Rugby
 Tom Webley, cricketer
 Dominic Wood, CBBC presenter Dick and Dom
 John Eakin, British Blind Open Golf champion - 2011
 The Turner Twins - Hugo & Ross Turner, adventurers
 Maddie Hinch, women's England and Great Britain hockey goalkeeper
Will Smeed, Somerset county cricket player

References

External links
 
 Profile on the Independent Schools Council website
 Old Aluredian website

Anglo-Catholic educational establishments
Boarding schools in Somerset
Member schools of the Headmasters' and Headmistresses' Conference
Private schools in Somerset
Woodard Schools
 
Educational institutions established in 1880
1880 establishments in England
Schools in Taunton
Church of England private schools in the Diocese of Bath and Wells